The 2006 St Albans City and District Council election took place on 4 May 2006 to elect members of St Albans District Council in Hertfordshire, England. One third of the council was up for election and the Liberal Democrats gained overall control of the council from no overall control.

After the election, the composition of the council was:
Liberal Democrats 31
Conservative 17
Labour 8
Independent 2

Campaign
Before the election the council was composed of 29 Liberal Democrats, 17 Conservative, 11 Labour and 1 Independent councillors. The Liberal Democrats hoped to win a majority at the election and complained about decisions being delayed by the opposition parties. However the Conservatives were also confident of making gains and said that a hung council with the best councillors from each party making up the cabinet was right for St Albans. Labour meanwhile were hopeful of holding onto their seats, expecting that they would perform better than in recent elections. As well as the 3 main parties on the council, the Green Party also stood candidates in every ward, while targeting Clarence ward as their best chance.

Election result
The Liberal Democrats regained overall control of the council that they had lost at the 1999 election after making a net gain of 2 seats. They gained 3 seats from Labour and 2 from the Conservatives, but also lost 3 seats in Marshalswick South, Redbourn and Verulam to the Conservatives. The 3 defeats for Labour included one in Sopwell ward, which they lost for what was described as "the first time in living memory". The results meant that the Liberal Democrats had a majority over the other parties of 4 seats after previously only having half of the councillors before the election, however the Conservatives did win more votes at the election than the Liberal Democrats. Overall turnout at the election was 45.1%.

In Wheathampstead ward the election ended in a tie after 3 recounts. The winner in the ward was decided by getting the 2 candidates to pick the longer pencil resulting in the Liberal Democrat Judith Shardlow defeating the Conservative former mayor Keith Stammers. Meanwhile, the Conservative group on the council was reduced, when councillor John Newman, left the party to sit as an independent councillor after having recently being replaced as Conservative group leader on the council by Teresa Heritage.

Ward results

References

2006
2006 English local elections
2000s in Hertfordshire